The history of Lagos starts in the 15th century or earlier. Lagos is the largest city of the West-African country of Nigeria, and its former capital; it is the third largest city in Africa in terms of population with about 15.3 million people. It is also the 4th largest economy in Africa.

Historical names
Lagos means "lakes" in Portuguese, the language of the first Europeans to arrive at the land already long inhabited by the Awori which belonged to the Yoruba people. To the Awori, the area was initially known as "Oko". Later on, the Kingdom of Benin dubbed the local settlement "Eko", before the Portuguese would refer to it as "Onim" and later "Lagos".

To differentiate the modern settlement from the older kingdom in the area, the name "Onim" has been applied to the latter by some historian such as Toby Green.

History

As a tributary of Benin and Oyo 
The island of Lagos was inhabited by Yoruba fishermen and hunters at least since the 15th century. In 1472, Portuguese explorers arrived, and began to trade, eventually followed by other Europeans. The area fell under the domain of Benin in the 16th century. By 1600, it served as a frontier town, and Benin limited its local presence to soldiers led by four military commanders. This military presence as well as the exchange with European traders resulted in economic growth, as locals would travel along the coast and from further inland to Lagos Island for trade; at this point, clothes were the main item sold at and exported from the island as well as Benin as a whole.

In the 17th century, the trade with the Portuguese also began to increase, as Onim became a center of the Atlantic slave trade. The local obas (kings) developed good relations with the Portuguese.

By the early 19th century, it was a small kingdom and a tributary to the Oyo Empire.  Like many West African states, Onim developed strong diplomatic as well as economic links to South America. It sent embassies to the Portuguese colony of Brazil, and became one of the first countries to recognize the independence of Brazil in 1823. Meanwhile, the Oyo Empire had begun to collapse. This allowed Lagos to assume the leading economic position regionally, becoming the most important market in the Yoruba territories as well as growing substantially.

From the crowning of Ado as its Oba, Lagos (then called Eko) had served as a major center for slave-trade, from which then Oba of Benin and all of his successors for over two centuries supported — until 1841, when Oba Akitoye ascended to the throne of Lagos and attempted to ban slave trading. Local merchants strongly opposed the intended move, and deposed and exiled the king, and installed Akitoye's brother Kosoko as Oba. Exiled to Europe, Akitoye met with British authorities, who had banned slave trading in 1807, and who therefore decided to support the deposed Oba to regain his throne. In the "Reduction of Lagos", the British militarily intervened in 1851, reinstalling Akitoye as Oba of Lagos. Lagos subsequently signed a treaty which ushered in the British consular period. In practical terms, however, British influence over the kingdom had become absolute.

Colonial Lagos

Lagos was annexed by Britain via the  Lagos Treaty of Cession in 1861 ending the consular period and starting the British colonial period. The remainder of modern-day Nigeria was seized in 1886. The British established the Colony and Protectorate of Nigeria in 1914 with Lagos as its capital.

Modern city 

Lagos maintained its status as capital when Nigeria obtained its independence from Britain in 1960. Lagos was therefore the capital city of Nigeria from 1914 until 1991, when it was replaced as Federal Capital Territory by planned city of Abuja, built specifically for such purpose. Lagos experienced rapid growth throughout the 1960s and 1970s as a result of Nigeria's economic boom prior to the Biafran War. This continued through the 1980s and 1990s up to the present date.

Lagos was the capital of Nigeria from 1914 - 1991 when the capital was moved to Abuja. Abuja is a capital like Washington, D.C. in United States and Brasilia in Brazil in that it was built from scratch specifically to be a capital.

In 1991, Ibrahim Babangida, the Military President and other government functions moved to the newly built capital. This was as a result of intelligence reports on the safety of his life and what was later to be termed his hidden agenda, which was the plan to turn himself into a civilian president. He finished what was started by the Murtala/Obasanjo regime. The change resulted in Lagos losing some prestige and economic leverage. However, it has retained its importance as the country's largest city and as an economic centre.

In 2002, accidental explosions killed more than 1,000 people. In 2012, 163 people were killed when a McDonnell Douglas MD-83 crashed into a local furniture works and printing press building.

Obas (Kings) of Onim / Lagos

Ashipa (1600–1630)
King Ado (1630–1669) first King of Lagos
King Gabaro (1669–1704)
King Akinsemoyin (1704–1749)
Eletu Kekere (1749)
King Ologun Kutere (1749–1775)
Adele Ajosun (1775-1780 & 1832-1834)
Eshilokun (1780–1819)
Oba Idewu Ojulari (1819–1832)
King Oluwole (1836–1841)
King Akintoye (1841-1845 & 1851-1853)
Oba Kosoko (1845–1851)
King Dosunmu [Docemo] (1853–1885)
Oba Oyekan I (1885–1900)
Oba Eshugbayi Eleko (1901-1925 & 1932)
Oba Ibikunle Akitoye (1925–1928)
Oba Sanusi Olusi (1928–1931)
Oba Falolu Dosunmu (1932–1949)
Oba Adeniji Adele (1949–1964)
Oba Adeyinka Oyekan II (1965–2003)
Oba Rilwan Akiolu (2003–present)

See also
 Timeline of Lagos
 Oba of Lagos

References

Works cited

Further reading
Victorian Lagos: Aspects of Nineteenth Century Lagos Life by Michael J. C.Echeruo. London: Macmillan 1977.